Mehdi Ghorbani (born January 12, 1988) is a professional boxer from the Islamic Republic of Iran who competed in the Light Heavyweight (-81 kg) division at the 2006 Asian Games winning the bronze medal in a lost semifinal bout against Tajikistan's Djakhon Kurbanov 10-30. He was born in Tehran, Iran.

At the first Olympic qualifier he lost to Zhang Xiaoping but at the second qualifier he qualified for the 2008 Olympics, where he later lost to Carlos Negron.

References

Boxers at the 2008 Summer Olympics
Boxers at the 2006 Asian Games
Olympic boxers of Iran
Asian Games bronze medalists for Iran
Asian Games medalists in boxing
1988 births
Living people
Iranian male boxers
Medalists at the 2006 Asian Games
Light-heavyweight boxers
21st-century Iranian people